Thomas Henry Goode (November 9, 1900 – September 12, 1983) was a Liberal party member of the House of Commons of Canada, representing the district of Burnaby—Richmond from 1949 to 1957. His son, Thomas Henry Goode, later represented the same electoral district from 1968 to 1972. Tom Goode died in Surrey in 1983 of a heart attack.

References

External links
 

1900 births
1983 deaths
Members of the House of Commons of Canada from British Columbia
Liberal Party of Canada MPs
People from Walthamstow